Alere 2 Refugee Settlement is located in Adjumani District in the Northern Region of Uganda.

Background 
On June 12, 1990, Alere 2 was created. Since then, over 6,000 people live in the settlement including Second Sudanese Civil War refugees.

Social services 
A project to build a sanitation system for Alere was started in 2019.

Health and sanitation 
32.6 percent of Alere refugees have access to latrines.

References 

Refugee camps in Uganda
Adjumani District
1990 establishments in Uganda
South Sudan–Uganda relations
South Sudanese diaspora